The Canadian Association of Gastroenterology (CAG) was founded in 1962 to promote the study of the digestive tract in health and disease, including liver disease. The Association is built on broad principles and includes individuals of different disciplines (physicians, surgeons, paediatricians, radiologists, basic scientists). Today, the Association comprises more than 1,100 members. CAG members are actively involved in research, education and patient care in all areas of digestive health and disease, contributing to the economic and social health of all Canadians.  The Canadian Digestive Health Foundation is the foundation of the CAG.

Journal of the Canadian Association of Gastroenterology

The Journal of the Canadian Association of Gastroenterology is a peer-reviewed medical journal dealing with topics in gastroenterology and in liver disease. It was established in 2018 as the official journal of the Canadian Association of Gastroenterology. The journal is published by Oxford University Press. The editor-in-chief is Eric Benchimol (University of Toronto).

References

External links

Journal of the Canadian Association of Gastroenterology

Gastroenterology organizations
Medical and health organizations based in Canada
1962 establishments in Canada
Organizations established in 1962
Scientific organizations established in 1962